Herrerism is the centre-right political faction of the National Party of Uruguay.

History and prominent members
Herrerism is named after the leader and founder of the faction, Luis Alberto de Herrera (1873–1959). His grandson, Luis Alberto Lacalle (1941–), President of Uruguay from 1990 to 1995, has long exercised a leading role in the group. Herrera's great-grandson Luis Alberto Lacalle Pou has also been elected president under the sponsorship of the group.

Ideology
The ideology of Herrerism is built on a foundation of economic liberalism and liberal conservatism, although earlier in its history it took on more anti-imperialist and traditionalist policies.

See also
 Politics of Uruguay
 National Party (Uruguay)#History
 List of political families#Uruguay

References

:es:Luis Alberto Lacalle Pou

Eponymous political ideologies
National Party (Uruguay)
Political party factions in Uruguay